Marian Bakermans-Kranenburg (born 19 June 1965) is a Dutch scientist focused on pedagogy and family relations, she is a professor at Leiden University where she works at the Centre for Child and Family Studies.

Career
Bakermans-Kranenburg was born in Alphen aan den Rijn. She earned a degree in general pedagogy and family relations at Leiden University in 1989. Four years later she earned a PhD under Marinus van IJzendoorn, with a thesis titled "The Adult Attachment Interniew: Psychometric analyse". Bakermans-Kranenburg stayed at Leiden University and started working at the Centre for Child and Family Studies, where she was an assistant professor until 2004. She was associate professor for another three years before being appointed as full professor in September 2007.

In 2009 Bakermans-Kranenburg earned a Vici award by the Netherlands Organisation for Scientific Research. In 2015 she obtained a European Research Council Advanced Grant to be spent on research improving the sensitivity of fathers to their newborn children.

Bakermans-Kranenburg became a member of the Royal Netherlands Academy of Arts and Sciences in 2012.

Bakermans-Kranenburg is an ISI Thomson Reuters Highly Cited Researcher 2016  placing her in the top 1% most cited scientists in the psychology-psychiatry world over 2004–2014.

On 2 June 2017 Bakermans-Kranenburg received an honorary doctorate at Lund University in Sweden. The Faculty of Social Sciences cited her contribution to developmental psychology as both deep and broad.

References

External links
 Profile at Leiden University

1965 births
Living people
Dutch educators
Dutch women educators
Leiden University alumni
Academic staff of Leiden University
Members of the Royal Netherlands Academy of Arts and Sciences
People from Alphen aan den Rijn